Feist is an action video game for PlayStation 4, Linux, OS X, Windows, and Xbox One. It launched on PC in July 2015. On December 13, 2016 it was released for PlayStation 4 and Xbox One.

Development
It was published by Finji Games as a platform game. The developer is Bits & Beasts in Switzerland.

Plot
The game follows a small furry animal, as it attempts to rescue its mate from a pack of predators.

Reception

The review aggregator website Metacritic gave it a score of 65 out of 100. GameSpew said it was visually very gorgeous, but gameplay had issues such as dropped frame rate.

References

External links

FEIST Game | PS4 - PlayStation

2015 video games
Android (operating system) games
IOS games
Linux games
MacOS games
PlayStation 4 games
Single-player video games
Video games developed in Switzerland
Windows games
Xbox One games
Video games with silhouette graphics
Finji games